Alisher Lutfulloyevich Dzhalilov ((), born 29 August 1993) is a Tajik professional football player who currently plays for Istiklol. Dzhalilov also holds Russian citizenship and has played for several Russian national youth football teams, including U-21 in 2013.

Career

Club
Dzhalilov made his Russian Premier League debut for FC Rubin Kazan on 18 June 2011 in a game against FC Rostov.

On 12 June 2017, he signed a two-year contract with FC Baltika Kaliningrad. 

In December 2021, Dzhalilov was announced as Tajikistan Player of the Year for the second time, having previously won the same award in 2019.

In January 2022, Dzhalilov signed for AGMK.

On 9 February 2023, Istiklol announced the return of Dzhalilov.

International
At the end of May 2019, Dzhalilov was called up to the Tajikistan national football team for the first time, for their games against Afghanistan and China. Dzhalilov however was withdrawn from the squad on 3 June 2019, due to a knee injury.
On 18 July 2019, Dzhalilov received international clearance from FIFA to play for Tajikistan. On 5 September 2019, he scored his first goal for the national team in match against Kyrgyzstan during the FIFA World Cup second qualifying round.

Career statistics

Club

International

Statistics accurate as of match played 29 March 2022

International goals
Scores and results list Tajikistan's goal tally first.

Honours

Club
Istiklol
 Tajik League (3): 2019, 2020, 2021
 Tajik Cup (1): 2019
Tajik Supercup (3): 2019, 2020, 2021

Individual
 Tajikistan player of the year (2): 2019, 2021

References

External links
 

1993 births
Living people
Sportspeople from Dushanbe
Tajikistani emigrants to Russia
Russian footballers
Russia youth international footballers
Russia under-21 international footballers
Association football midfielders
Tajikistani footballers
Tajikistan international footballers
Russian Premier League players
Russian people of Tajikistani descent
FC Rubin Kazan players
FC Baltika Kaliningrad players
FC Neftekhimik Nizhnekamsk players
Tajikistan Higher League players